Ridin' Thumb is a Danish soul/funk orchestra formed in 1989 by the two guitarists Martin Finding and Nicolai Halberg. In 1997, Jonas Winge Leisner replaced Niels H.P. as the lead vocalist. Their style can be compared to artists such as Tower of Power and Jamiroquai.
The group has released four full-length albums and one EP.

Members
Jonas Winge Leisner – vocal
Stine Hjelm Jacobsen – vocal
Joakim Pedersen – keyboards
Martin Finding – guitar
Nicolai Halberg – guitar
Jens Kristian Uhrenholdt – bass guitar
Thomas Jepsen – drums
Martin Pedersen – scratch
Bjørn Ringkjøbing – trumpet
Hendrik Jørgensen – trumpet
Mik Neumann – tenor saxophone
Ole Himmelstrup – baritone saxophone

Concerts
The band usually unites for an annual concert between Christmas and New Year's Eve. The concerts are held at the Copenhagen Jazz House.

Discography

Albums

EPs
1993: Ridin' Thumb

Singles

External links
 ridinthumb.dk

Danish musical groups